Nilesh Moreshwar Kulkarni  (born 3 April 1973) is a former Indian cricketer. He is a slow left-arm bowler and left-handed lower order batsman who stood large at 6 ft 4 inches (193 cm).

Kulkarni was one of the many Mumbai players that got picked for India during Sachin Tendulkar's tenure as captain. Kulkarni wrote himself into cricketing history by taking a wicket with the very first ball that he bowled in Test cricket, becoming the first Indian bowler, and the twelfth bowler overall, to do so. This was in the Test at Colombo against Sri Lanka in 1997–98. He took the wicket of Marvan Attapattu of his very first delivery in Test cricket. However Sri Lanka went on to score excess of 900 runs in that game which was a world record at the time.

Kulkarni has spent all his first-class career with Mumbai taking over 300 wickets with best figures of 7/60 against Andhra in 2004. Kulkarni played for Old Hamptonians CC in the Surrey Championship in the UK during the 2007 and 2008 seasons. Kulkarni retired From International & First Class Cricket on 28 July 2010.

Kulkarni is the Founder Director of International Institute of Sports Management, a Sports Management institute in Mumbai. IISM was the proud recipient of Rashtriya Khel Protsahan Puraskar 2020 conferred by the Hon. President of India Ram Nath Kovindji.

4. Member of CII's SPORTSCOM Industry Confederation

References

External links 
 

1973 births
Indian cricketers
India Test cricketers
India One Day International cricketers
Living people
Mumbai cricketers
People from Dombivali
West Zone cricketers